Lisa Aversa Richette (September 11, 1928 – October 26, 2007) was an American lawyer and judge of the Court of Common Pleas in Philadelphia County. A lifelong Philadelphian, she was appointed to the bench in 1971. Noted for her outspokenness, she was a social activist, particularly in the areas of homelessness, child welfare, and juvenile justice.

Richette was a graduate of the Philadelphia High School for Girls. She was one of the first female graduates of Yale Law School. She became an assistant district attorney, one of a handful of groundbreaking women in the local legal profession along with the future long serving District Attorney of Philadelphia Lynne Abraham. Once thrown out of court for wearing a pantsuit, Richette often wore pants and long dangling earrings in court at a time when it was considered almost risqué for a female attorney to do so. In 1971, she was appointed judge of the Court of Common Pleas for Philadelphia County, being one of the first females to hold that office.

Richette was the author of the 1969 book on the juvenile justice system in Philadelphia, The Throwaway Children. In 1973 she founded the Child Abuse Prevention Effort (CAPE). She taught at Yale Law School and Villanova University. In 1984, she was awarded the Pearl S. Buck International Award.

Late in her life, Richette made local headlines on three occasions as a result of being physically assaulted. She was mugged in 1987, while "scores of people watched without helping her". In 2006, she was punched while waiting for her son to rent a video. In 2007, her son, Lawrence was charged with aggravated assault, simple assault, and reckless endangerment in connection with a domestic dispute that occurred on August 21, 2007.

She died of lung cancer at the Vitas Hospice in St Agnes' Continuing Care Center in South Philadelphia, aged 79.

References

1928 births
2007 deaths
American activists
20th-century American educators
Deaths from lung cancer in Pennsylvania
Philadelphia High School for Girls alumni
Lawyers from Philadelphia
Yale Law School alumni
Yale Law School faculty
20th-century American judges
American women legal scholars
American legal scholars
20th-century American women judges
20th-century American women educators
20th-century American lawyers
American women academics
Judges of the Pennsylvania Courts of Common Pleas
21st-century American women
American people of Italian descent